Ogoni/Niger Delta News is a news website that publishes daily news about Ogoniland, the Niger Delta, Rivers state, Nigeria and the world at large.  Most of its news is taken from sources such as Vanguard, the Leadership, newspaper and the DailyPost Nigeria.

The site was launched on July 22, 2012  and has since been visited by people from more than 87 countries. In December 2013, the site had 36,782 unique visitors monthly, with most coming from the United States, followed by the United Kingdom. Nigeria ranked 4th.

The website gained popularity when it was featured on the UNPO website and another Ogoni news website called Ogoninews.com.

References

Niger River Delta
Nigerian news websites